Robert P. White (born August 24, 1963) is a retired United States Army lieutenant general who last served as commander of Fort Hood, Texas and as the 61st Commanding General of III Armored Corps. Over 90,000 soldiers were under his command. From September 2019 to September 2020, he also served as commander of Combined Joint Task Force – Operation Inherent Resolve (CJTF-OIR).

Education
White holds a Bachelor of Arts in History from Claremont McKenna College, a Master of Science in Administration from Central Michigan University, and a Master of Science in Strategic Studies from the United States Army War College.

White's military education includes the Armor Officer Basic and Advanced Courses, the Field Artillery Officer Advanced Course, the United States Army Command and General Staff College, the Joint and Combined Warfighting School, and the United States Army War College.

Military career
White commissioned in the United States Army as an Armor Officer in 1986, and has served in a variety of United States Army, Joint, Combined, and staff positions while stationed on 4 continents. He has served in the Iraq War, the War in Afghanistan, and Operation Inherent Resolve commanding formations all the way up to the corps level. From September 2019 to September 2020, he was in command of the United States led intervention against ISIS as the commander of CJTF-OIR while also commanding III Corps and Fort Hood.

Awards and decorations

References

1963 births
United States Army personnel of the Iraq War
United States Army personnel of the War in Afghanistan (2001–2021)
Lieutenant generals
Living people
Recipients of the Defense Distinguished Service Medal
Recipients of the Defense Superior Service Medal
Recipients of the Distinguished Service Medal (US Army)
Recipients of the Legion of Merit
United States Army generals